Hassan Babur Nehru, also Babar-ul-Islam Nehru or Babur, is a human rights activist, lawyer and social worker from the Chenab Valley region of Jammu and Kashmir (union territory). He is the founder of Ababeel, a non-governmental organization that focuses on relief, disaster management, and rescue operations. Babur is among the various Indian activists who are allegedly under the surveillance of Israel's spy software, Pegasus.

Early life and education

Babur was born in Doda, Jammu and Kashmir. His father is Zaffarullah Nehru and mother Farida Begum. Babur completed his early education in Chenab Valley and later pursued his law degree from University of Jammu.

Career

After completing his law degree, Babur started practicing law in Jammu and Kashmir High Court. He initially worked as a lawyer for several individuals and organizations, but later shifted his focus towards human rights activism. 

In 2014, Babur founded Ababeel, an NGO that primarily focuses on relief, disaster management and rescue operations in the Chenab Valley region.

Babur has also been involved in several human rights cases and has actively raised his voice against the human rights violations in Jammu and Kashmir. In 2016, Babur was arrested under the Public Safety Act (PSA) for the first time. In 2017, he was again booked under PSA and lodged to Kotbhalwal Jail. His arrest was met with widespread criticism from various human rights organizations, who claimed that he was arrested without any crime. He is the second person in Doda district, booked under PSA.

In 2018, Babur was arrested again under the PSA and was detained for several months. His arrest was again met with criticism from various organizations, who claimed that he was targeted for his human rights activism.

References

Living people
1986 births
 Doda district
 Chenab Valley